Chile at the 1912 Summer Olympics in Stockholm, Sweden was the nation's first official appearance out of four editions of the Summer Olympic Games. Some sources claim that Chile was represented by one athlete that competed at the 1896 Summer Olympics. The all-male 1912 national team of fourteen athletes competed in sixteen events in four sports.

Athletics

6 athletes represented Chile.

Ranks given are within that athlete's heat for running events.

Cycling

Four cyclists represented Chile. It was the first appearance of the nation in cycling. Alberto Downey had the best time in the time trial, the only race held, placing 42nd. The team of four had a combined time that placed them 9th of the 15 teams.

Road cycling

Equestrian

 Jumping

Shooting 

Two shooters represented Chile. It was the nation's debut in shooting. Both men took part in the same four events, with Ekwall being the better of the pair in three of those events.

References

External links
Official Olympic Reports

Nations at the 1912 Summer Olympics
1912
Olympics